United Cattle Products (UCP) was a chain of shops and restaurants in the north of England which specialised in tripe dishes.  In the 1950s there were 146 restaurants.

References

External links
 UCP Tripe - Site collecting and sharing memories, documents and images related to the United Cattle Products Ltd.

Restaurant groups in the United Kingdom
Companies based in Lancashire